Moving (translit. Ohikkoshi) is a 1993 Japanese drama film directed by Shinji Sōmai. It was screened in the Un Certain Regard section at the 1993 Cannes Film Festival.

Cast
 Kiichi Nakai
 Junko Sakurada
 Tsurube Shôfukutei
 Mariko Sudo
 Tomoko Tabata as Renko
 Taro Tanaka

References

External links

1993 films
Films directed by Shinji Sōmai
1990s Japanese-language films
1993 drama films
Films with screenplays by Satoko Okudera
Japanese drama films
1990s Japanese films